The 2007–08 FIS Snowboard World Cup is a multi race tournament over a season for snowboarding. The season began on 1 September 2007, and finished on 3 March 2008. The World Cup is organized by the FIS who also runs world cups and championships in cross-country skiing, ski jumping, Nordic combined, alpine skiing, and freestyle skiing.

Calendar

Fixtures / Results

Standings

Men

Overall

Parallel slalom

Snowboardcross

Halfpipe

Big Air

Women

Overall

Parallel slalom

Snowboardcross

Halfpipe

External links
 FIS Snowboard World Cup Results
Official site

FIS Snowboard World Cup
Fis Snowboard World Cup, 2007-08
Fis Snowboard World Cup, 2007-08